Colwood is a city located on Vancouver Island to the southwest of Victoria, capital of British Columbia, Canada. Colwood was incorporated in 1985 and has a population of approximately 17,000 people. Colwood lies within the boundaries of the Greater Victoria area or Capital Regional District, in a region called the Western Communities, or the West Shore. It is one of the 13 component municipalities of Greater Victoria.

Set along more than 5 km of oceanfront, this fast-growing seaside community is home to abundant forests, parks and trails as well as several historic sites including Fort Rodd Hill, Fosgard Lighthouse and Hatley Castle. One of Colwood's best known landmarks is Hatley Castle, now home to Royal Roads University. It is a Scottish Baronial mansion and grounds originally built as a residence for James Dunsmuir, Premier and later Lieutenant Governor of British Columbia. Colwood almost became the seat of the Crown of the Commonwealth realm in 1940, when, after the start of World War II, the government planned to relocate King George VI, Queen Elizabeth, and their children, Princesses Elizabeth and Margaret, to the castle for protection. But they decided to stay in London and Windsor, near the European front. The government transferred the estate to the Canadian Armed Forces. It adapted the site for use as Royal Roads Military College, a naval training facility from 1941-mid-1990s. The military college was closed in the 1990s, and the estate is now the campus of the public Royal Roads University, which opened in 1995. The original residence is surrounded by extensive formal gardens, including a featured Japanese garden.

The Fisgard Lighthouse in Colwood is one of Canada's National Historic Sites. There hasn't been a keeper here since the light was automated in 1929, but every year many thousands of visitors step inside a real 19th century light and capture some of the feeling of ships wrecked and lives saved. Built by the British in 1860, when Vancouver Island was not yet part of Canada, Fisgard's red brick house and white tower has stood faithfully at the entrance to Esquimalt Harbour. Once a beacon for the British Royal Navy's Pacific Squadron, today Fisgard still marks home base for the Maritime Forces Pacific of the Royal Canadian Navy.

Colwood is also home to historic Fort Rodd Hill, another Canadian National Historic Site. Built by the British in the 1890s, this coast artillery fort was designed to defend Victoria and the Esquimalt Naval Base. Visitors come to explore the three gun batteries, underground magazines, command posts, guardhouses, barracks and searchlight emplacements that are the vestiges of a bygone era. Set on a wide open waterfront park near the Fisgard Lighthouse, visitors can see the sea and mountain views, go for bird watches and investigate the tide pools along the shoreline.

The city has many regional amenities, including the City's waterfront at Esquimalt Lagoon which includes a National Migratory Bird Sanctuary, the Juan de Fuca Recreation Centre, The Q Centre, Royal Colwood Golf Club, Olympic View Golf Club and the library facilities for the Western Communities. As it lies geographically to the south of Victoria, Colwood is western Canada's southernmost city.

Neighbourhoods of Colwood
 Belmont Park
 Colwood Corners
 Esquimalt Lagoon
 Hatley Park
 Wishart
 Royal Roads
 Triangle Mountain
 Royal Bay
 Latoria Walk

Demographics

The median household income in 2015 for Colwood was $85,688, which is above the British Columbia provincial average of $69,995.

Ethnicity

Religion 
According to the 2021 census, religious groups in Colwood included:
Irreligion (11,685 persons or 62.2%)
Christianity (6,410 persons or 34.1%)
Islam (145 persons or 0.8%)
Buddhism (115 persons or 0.6%)
Judaism (90 persons or 0.5%)
Hinduism (80 persons or 0.4%)
Sikhism (40 persons or 0.2%)
Other (220 persons or 1.2%)

Education
Colwood is a part of the School District 62 Sooke.
There are six elementary schools: John Stubbs (in Belmont Park), Colwood, Hans Helgesen, David Cameron, Sangster, and Wishart. There is one middle school: Dunsmuir. There is also an alternative school program called Pacific Secondary School (formerly WON western opportunity network). A new high school, Royal Bay Secondary School, opened in 2015.

Colwood is also home to Royal Roads University.

History

 
Esquimalt Lagoon is a beach and wildlife preserve with a view of Hatley Castle, Royal Roads University in the background. A small plaque on a concrete cairn in the shore of the Esquimalt Lagoon outlines its history. 
"Royal Roads - To seaward lies an anchorage or roadstead first used in 1790 by the Spanish and named in 1846 for its location between Albert Head and Victoria. Unloading place for large vessels serving Victoria in days of sail, it was once a scene of disaster. On April 1, 1883 a southeasterly gale swept the haven, beaching the ships Southern Chief, Gettysburg, Connaught and Tiger. Province of British Columbia. Erected by the Themopylac Club 1973."

Colwood was originally one of four large farms established by the Hudson's Bay Company in the 1850s to supply the steadily increasing population of Fort Victoria.

In 1851 The Puget Sound Agricultural Company, a subsidiary of the Hudson's Bay Company, appointed Capt. Edward E. Langford 'bailiff' of the 600 acre Esquimalt Farm lying between Esquimalt Harbour and the present Langford Lake. The farmhouse was called 'Colwood' after his home in Sussex, England. The first stone dairy on the island was built on this farm as was a lime kiln, homestead and barn. Kanakas (Hawaiian Islanders) were employed as shepherds for the herd of Southdown sheep. Mrs. Langford gave birth to the first white male child born in the colony. Capt. Langford's sister opened a School for Young Ladies at 'Colwood' Farm.

In 1860 Fisgard Lighthouse was constructed at the mouth of Esquimalt Harbour. It was 47 ft high, and visible for 10 nautical miles. In 1950 it was connected by a causeway to the shore at the base of Fort Rodd Hill.

1863	A sawmill was opened on Colwood Creek above the Indian burial site on Esquimalt Lagoon, on what is now Royal Roads University land. John Gilmore owned the sawmill.

1874	The original Colwood school was built on Sooke Road on land donated by Arthur Peatt, a local farmer. The building was later transferred across the road and became the home of the Ross family.

1892	 William John Wale leased the old 600-acre Colwood Farm for the sum of $400 per year.

1895 Fort Rodd Hill installation was armed. The Fort guarded the entrance to the Royal Navy yards at Esquimalt. The original Colwood Hotel was burned down and a 2-story framed, square shaped building was rebuilt by the proprietor, Mr Campbell. He later enlarged the building and sold it to Mrs Miller, who became the owner of the Goldstream Inn.

1910	Colwood Women's Institute formed.

Notes

References

External links

Populated places on the British Columbia Coast
Cities in British Columbia
Populated places in the Capital Regional District
Southern Vancouver Island
Greater Victoria